Laurent Paganelli (born 20 October 1962) is a French former professional footballer who played as a striker. He works as a journalist (consultant) for Canal + since 1997. He holds the record of the youngest player in French Division 1.

Honours
Saint-Étienne
 French Division 1: 1980–81
 Coupe de France runner-up: 1980–81, 1981–82

References

External links
Profile

1962 births
Living people
People from Aubenas
French people of Corsican descent
French footballers
AS Saint-Étienne players
SC Toulon players
Ligue 1 players
Ligue 2 players
French journalists
French male non-fiction writers
Association football forwards
Sportspeople from Ardèche
AC Avignonnais players
Footballers from Auvergne-Rhône-Alpes